Alencar Peak is a  peak at the head of Lind Glacier, standing  east of Cape Perez on the west side of Graham Land in Antarctica. It was discovered by the French Antarctic Expedition of 1908–10 under Jean-Baptiste Charcot and was named by him for Admiral Alexandrino Faria de Alencar, a Brazilian Navy Minister at the time.

References 

Mountains of Graham Land
Graham Coast